Strawberry Wine may refer to:
 A fruit wine made from strawberries
"Strawberry Wine" (Deana Carter song), 1996
"Strawberry Wine" (My Bloody Valentine song), 1987
"Strawberry Wine", a song by The Band from the 1970 album Stage Fright
"Strawberry Wine", a song by Ryan Adams from the 2005 album 29
"Strawberry Wine (Life Is Sweet)", a song by Pat Benatar from the 1997 album Innamorata
Strawberry Wine, a 1966 jazz album by Mike Wofford